Stanley Andrews (born Stanley Martin Andrzejewski; August 28, 1891 – June 23, 1969) was an American actor perhaps best known as the voice of Daddy Warbucks on the radio program Little Orphan Annie and later as "The Old Ranger", the first host of the syndicated western anthology television series, Death Valley Days.

Biography

Early life
Andrews was born in Chicago, Illinois as Stanley Martin Andrzejewski. Little is known of his early years, except that he was reared in the Midwest. As a young adult, he acted on stage and in radio.

Career
Andrews worked in stock theater early in his career. In an interview in 1957, he credited acting in Minneapolis in 1916 for giving him the confidence necessary "to embark on a successful career." He recalled that the troupe presented a different play each week for 52 weeks.

His first big role was on radio as Daddy Warbucks in the Little Orphan Annie series, where he starred from 1931 to  1936. He appeared in more than 250 movies, which included Mr. Deeds Goes to Town, Beau Geste, Mr. Smith Goes to Washington, The Ox-Bow Incident, It's a Great Life, State of the Union, The Lemon Drop Kid, Superman and the Mole Men (the very first theatrical Superman film); his final film role in Cry Terror! in 1958.·

Besides his regular appearances on Death Valley Days, he appeared in seventeen episodes of The Range Rider, with Jock Mahoney and Dick Jones, eleven segments of Annie Oakley, ten episodes of The Gene Autry Show, seven episodes of The Lone Ranger, six appearances on Buffalo Bill, Jr., again with Dick Jones, and four times each on Tales of the Texas Rangers and the western aviation series, Sky King.

In the latter series with Kirby Grant and Gloria Winters, Andrews was cast as Jim Herrick in "Danger Point", and as Josh Bradford in "The Threatening Bomb" (both 1952) and as Old Dan Grable in "Golden Burro" and as Pop Benson in "Rustlers on Wheels" (both 1956). Andrews portrayed Dr. Henry Fulmer in the 1955 episode "Joey Saves the Day" of the NBC children's western series, Fury.

His role as the Old Ranger began in 1952 and ended in 1963, when the sponsors of Death Valley Days, U.S. Borax, decided upon a younger man to be the series host, Ronald Reagan. When Reagan left the show to run for Governor, hosting duties were taken over by Reagan's good friend, Robert Taylor. Taylor died of cancer during the series run and was succeeded by Dale Robertson.

Death
In 1969, Andrews died in Los Angeles, California, aged 77.

Selected filmography

 Roman Scandals (1933) - Official (uncredited) (film debut)
 Evelyn Prentice (1934) - Judge (uncredited)
 Wings in the Dark (1935) - Jack, an Official (uncredited)
 After Office Hours (1935) - Theatre Patron (uncredited)
 All the King's Horses (1935) - Count Batthy
 Transient Lady (1935) - Judge (uncredited)
 Times Square Lady (1935) - Doctor at Hockey Game (uncredited)
 Private Worlds (1935) - Dr. Barnes
 It Happened in New York (1935) - Plainclothesman (uncredited)
 Mississippi (1935) - Gambler with 4 Aces (uncredited)
 The Call of the Savage (1935, Serial) - Emperor Mena [Ch. 12]
 Stolen Harmony (1935) - Patrol Chief (uncredited)
 Goin' to Town (1935) - Engineer (uncredited)
 Hold 'Em Yale (1935) - Judge (uncredited)
 Alias Mary Dow (1935) - Detective (uncredited)
 People Will Talk (1935) - Willis McBride
 So Red the Rose (1935) - Cavalry Captain (uncredited)
 College Scandal (1935) - Jim (Fingerprint Man)
 Men Without Names (1935) - Jim, the Fingerprint Man
 The Murder Man (1935) - Police Commissioner (uncredited)
 Curly Top (1935) - Orphanage Trustee (uncredited)
 Woman Wanted (1935) - Jury Foreman (uncredited)
 She Gets Her Man (1935) - Kelly (uncredited)
 Orchids to You (1935) - Judge at Flower Show (uncredited)
 The Crusades (1935) - Amir (uncredited)
 Annapolis Farewell (1935) - Officer in Brigg's Office (uncredited)
 Here's to Romance (1935) - Father (uncredited)
 Anna Karenina (1935) - Husband - Third Couple (uncredited)
 Diamond Jim (1935) - Gambler (uncredited)
 Wanderer of the Wasteland (1935) - Sheriff Collinshaw
 The Big Broadcast of 1936 (1935) - Gordoni's Servant with Dog (uncredited)
 She Couldn't Take It (1935) - Attorney Wyndersham (uncredited)
 It's in the Air (1935) - Investigator (uncredited)
 Three Kids and a Queen (1935) - Federal Man (uncredited)
 Peter Ibbetson (1935) - Judge (uncredited)
 Escape from Devil's Island (1935) - Steve Harrington
 In Old Kentucky (1935) - Steward (uncredited)
 Nevada (1935) - Cawthorne
 Dangerous Intrigue (1936) - Mr. Mitchell
 You May Be Next (1936) - Naval Commander (uncredited)
 Dangerous Waters (1936) - Steamship Company Agent (uncredited)
 Drift Fence (1936) - Clay Jackson
 Desire (1936) - Customs Inspector (uncredited)
 Sutter's Gold (1936) - Senator Rand (uncredited)
 Mr. Deeds Goes to Town (1936) - James Cedar (uncredited)
 Florida Special (1936) - Armstrong, the Railroad President
 Counterfeit (1936) - Duffield (uncredited)
 Parole! (1936) - Williams (uncredited)
 White Fang (1936) - Police Sergeant Drake (uncredited)
 The Texas Rangers (1936) - First Higgins Henchman (uncredited)
 The Devil Is a Sissy (1936) - Doctor (uncredited)
 In His Steps (1936) - Broderick
 Alibi for Murder (1936) - Earl Quillan (uncredited)
 Craig's Wife (1936) - Police Officer Davis (uncredited)
 Wild Brian Kent (1936) - Tony Baxter
 The Plainsman (1936) - Officer (uncredited)
 Pennies from Heaven (1936) - Detective Stephens (uncredited)
 Let's Make a Million (1936) - Cliff Spaulding
 Happy Go Lucky (1936) - Capt. Matzdorf
 Find the Witness (1937) - District Attorney
 The Devil's Playground (1937) - Salvage Boat Commander
 She's Dangerous (1937) - Franklin Webb
 A Doctor's Diary (1937) - Dr. Wilson (uncredited)
 John Meade's Woman (1937) - Mr. Westley (uncredited)
 Nancy Steele Is Missing! (1937) - Warden - 1936 (uncredited)
 Her Husband Lies (1937) - District Attorney (uncredited)
 The Man Who Found Himself (1937) - Inspector Grey (uncredited)
 The Last Train from Madrid (1937) - Secret Service Man (uncredited)
 Born Reckless (1937) - Police Commissioner (uncredited)
 Easy Living (1937) - Police Captain Jackson (uncredited)
 High, Wide, and Handsome (1937) - Lem Moulton
 Blonde Trouble (1937) - Head Janitor (uncredited)
 Souls at Sea (1937) - First Mate (uncredited)
 The Man Who Cried Wolf (1937) - A Judge (uncredited)
 Double or Nothing (1937) - Police Lieutenant (uncredited)
 Big City (1937) - Detective Bennett (uncredited)
 Dangerously Yours (1937) - Houston, the Customs Inspector (uncredited)
 Madame X (1937) - Gendarme Testifying in Court (uncredited)
 Conquest (1937) - Prince Mirska (uncredited)
 Blossoms on Broadway (1937) - Chairman (uncredited)
 She Married an Artist (1937) - Editor (uncredited)
 Checkers (1937) - Deputy (uncredited)
 The Bad Man of Brimstone (1937) - Clergyman (uncredited)
 The Buccaneer (1938) - Collector of the Port
 Penitentiary (1938) - Prison Capt. Dorn (uncredited)
 The Lone Ranger (1938, Serial) - Capt. Smith - aka Col. Jeffries
 Forbidden Valley (1938) - Hoke Lanning
 When G-Men Step In (1938) - Preston
 Tip-Off Girls (1938) - Police Sergeant (uncredited)
 Cocoanut Grove (1938) - Truant Officer (uncredited)
 Alexander's Ragtime Band (1938) - Colonel
 Three Comrades (1938) - Officer Giving Toast (uncredited)
 Speed to Burn (1938) - Police Chief (uncredited)
 I'll Give a Million (1938) - Captain
 Spawn of the North (1938) - Partridge
 You Can't Take It With You (1938) - Attorney to Kirby at Arraignment (uncredited)
 Juvenile Court (1938) - Mayor (uncredited)
 Hold That Co-ed (1938) - Belcher - Committeeman (uncredited)
 The Mysterious Rider (1938) - William Bellounds
 Prairie Moon (1938) - Frank Welch
 Stablemates (1938) - Track Steward (uncredited)
 The Lady Objects (1938) - Baker
 Adventure in Sahara (1938) - Col. Rancreux
 Blondie (1938) - Mr. Hicks (uncredited)
 Road Demon (1938) - Chairman Colton (uncredited)
 Kentucky (1938) - Presiding Judge
 Shine On, Harvest Moon (1938) - Pa Jackson
 Homicide Bureau (1939) - Police Commissioner
 Pirates of the Skies (1939) - Maj. Smith
 Hotel Imperial (1939) - Col. Paloff (uncredited)
 First Offenders (1939) - District Attorney (uncredited)
 The Lady's from Kentucky (1939) - Doctor
 Union Pacific (1939) - Dr. Harkness (uncredited)
 Racketeers of the Range (1939) - Sam - Continental Packing Boss (uncredited)
 Andy Hardy Gets Spring Fever (1939) - James Willet (uncredited)
 Beau Geste (1939) - Maris
 Coast Guard (1939) - Comdr. Hooker
 Golden Boy (1939) - Driscoll - Fight Official (uncredited)
 Mr. Smith Goes to Washington (1939) - Senator Hodges (uncredited)
 The Housekeeper's Daughter (1939) - Police Captain (uncredited)
 Geronimo (1939) - Colombus Delano (uncredited)
 Joe and Ethel Turp Call on the President (1939) - George - Policeman (uncredited)
 Charlie McCarthy, Detective (1939) - Freight Captain (uncredited)
 Hi-Yo Silver (1940) - Captain Smith / Colonel Jeffries (archive footage)
 The Green Hornet (1940, Serial) - Police Commissioner [Chs. 1, 5, 8, 9, 13]
 The Man Who Wouldn't Talk (1940) - Colonel (uncredited)
 The Blue Bird (1940) - Wilhelm   
 Convicted Woman (1940) - Prosecutor (uncredited)
 Little Old New York (1940) - Patrol Captain
 Strange Cargo (1940) - Constable (uncredited)
 Johnny Apollo (1940) - Welfare Secretary
 Maryland (1940) - Dr. John Trimble (uncredited)
 Brigham Young (1940) - Hyrum Smith
 Kit Carson (1940) - Larkin
 The Westerner (1940) - Sheriff (uncredited)
 Colorado (1940) - Colonel Gibbons (uncredited)
 King of the Royal Mounted (1940, Serial) - Tom Merritt Sr. [Ch. 1]
 So You Won't Talk (1940) - Press Foreman (uncredited)
 The Mark of Zorro (1940) - Commanding Officer (uncredited)
 The Son of Monte Cristo (1940) - Turnkey
 Play Girl (1941) - Joseph Shawhan
 Meet John Doe (1941) - Weston
 In Old Colorado (1941) - George Davidson
 Las Vegas Nights (1941) - Sheriff (uncredited)
 Dead Men Tell (1941) - Inspector Vesey (uncredited)
 Strange Alibi (1941) - Lieutenant-Detective Pagle
 Time Out for Rhythm (1941) - James Anderson
 Lady Scarface (1941) - Police Capt. L. Andrews (uncredited)
 Wild Geese Calling (1941) - Delaney
 Man at Large (1941) - FBI Chief Ed Ruby (uncredited)
 Borrowed Hero (1941) - Mr. Taylor, Defense Attorney
 The Bugle Sounds (1942) - Veterinarian (uncredited)
 North to the Klondike (1942) - Tom Allen
 Mr. and Mrs. North (1942) - Policeman (uncredited)
 The Fleet's In (1942) - Lt. Commander (uncredited)
 The Power of God (1942) - Edward Hale
 Valley of the Sun (1942) - Major at Court Martial (uncredited)
 Reap the Wild Wind (1942) - Turnkey (uncredited)
 Canal Zone (1942) - Cmdr. Merrill
 To the Shores of Tripoli (1942) - Doctor (uncredited)
 Mississippi Gambler (1942) - Colonel (uncredited)
 My Gal Sal (1942) - Mr. Dreiser
 Ten Gentlemen from West Point (1942) - Capt. Sloane
 The Postman Didn't Ring (1942) - Postal Insp. Brennan
 The Major and the Minor (1942) - Conductor #1 (uncredited)
 The Navy Comes Through (1942) - Judge Advocate (uncredited)
 Flight for Freedom (1943) - Prosperous Gent (uncredited)
 Crash Dive (1943) - Shipwrecked Captain (uncredited)
 Daredevils of the West (1943, Serial) - Col. Andrews [Ch. 1, 12]
 The Ox-Bow Incident (1943) - Bartlett (uncredited)
 Bombardier (1943) - Congressman (uncredited)
 It's a Great Life (1943) - Attorney Schuster #2 (uncredited)
 Dixie (1943) - Mr. Masters (uncredited)
 The Adventures of a Rookie (1943) - Gen. Ames (uncredited)
 Riding High (1943) - Reynolds (uncredited)
 Canyon City (1943) - Johnson - Water Co. President
 In Old Oklahoma (1943) - Mason - Indian Agent (uncredited)
 True to Life (1943) - Frank, Bakery Foreman (uncredited)
 It Happened Tomorrow (1944) - Policeman (uncredited)
 Rosie the Riveter (1944) - General (uncredited)
 Follow the Boys (1944) - Australian Officer (uncredited)
 The Hitler Gang (1944) - Otto Meissner (uncredited)
 Tucson Raiders (1944) - Governor York
 Man from Frisco (1944) - Chief Campbell
 Sensations of 1945 (1944) - Mr. Collins (uncredited)
 Wing and a Prayer (1944) - Marine General (uncredited)
 Atlantic City (1944) - Rogers
 Vigilantes of Dodge City (1944) - General Wingate (uncredited)
 The Princess and the Pirate (1944) - Captain 'Mary Ann'
 Faces in the Fog (1944) - Iverson, Juror (uncredited)
 Music for Millions (1944) - Doctor in Hospital (uncredited)
 Practically Yours (1944) - Shipyard Official (uncredited)
 Lake Placid Serenade (1944) - Executive (uncredited)
 Keep Your Powder Dry (1945) - Colonel Greeting Cadets (uncredited)
 Between Two Women (1945) - Slipper Room Patron (uncredited)
 Trail to Vengeance (1945) - Sheriff Morgan
 Code of the Lawless (1945) - Chadwick Hilton, Sr.
 The Daltons Ride Again (1945) - Tex Walters (uncredited)
 Road to Utopia (1945) - Joe - Official at Ship (uncredited)
 Adventure (1945) - Bit Part (uncredited)
 God's Country (1946) - Howard King
 The Hoodlum Saint (1946) - Chronicle Publisher (uncredited)
 The Virginian (1946) - Rancher (uncredited)
 Bad Bascomb (1946) - Col. Cartright (uncredited)
 Smoky (1946) - Fred Kramer - Rancher (uncredited)
 Mr. Ace (1946) - Tomahawk Club Boss (uncredited)
 Two Years Before the Mast (1946) - Policeman (uncredited)
 Wake Up and Dream (1946) - Conductor (uncredited)
 Till the Clouds Roll By (1946) - Doctor (uncredited)
 San Quentin (1946) - Head Guard (uncredited)
 It's a Wonderful Life (1946) - Mr. Welch (uncredited)
 California (1947) - Willoughby (uncredited)
 Scared to Death (1947) - Pathologist
 Easy Come, Easy Go (1947) - Detective (uncredited)
 Trail Street (1947) - Ferguson (uncredited)
 The Michigan Kid (1947) - Sheriff of Rawhide
 The Sea of Grass (1947) - Bill the Sheriff (uncredited)
 Millie's Daughter (1947) - Detective (uncredited)
 King of the Wild Horses (1947) - Sheriff Jason Ballau (uncredited)
 High Barbaree (1947) - Farmer (uncredited)
 Blaze of Noon (1947) - Bartender (uncredited)
 Framed (1947) - Detective (uncredited)
 Robin Hood of Texas (1947) - Mr. Hamby - Saddle Shop Owner
 Killer Dill (1947) - Mr. Jones - Underwear Customer (uncredited)
 Desire Me (1947) - Emile (fishing boat captain) (uncredited)
 The Fabulous Texan (1947) - Vigilante Leader (uncredited)
 Road to Rio (1947) - Capt. Harmon
 Perilous Waters (1948) - Capt. Porter
 Panhandle (1948) - Tyler
 The Man from Texas (1948) - Sheriff (uncredited)
 I Remember Mama (1948) - Minister (uncredited)
 Docks of New Orleans (1948) - Theodore Von Scherbe
 Mr. Blandings Builds His Dream House (1948) - Mr. Murphy (uncredited)
 State of the Union (1948) - Senator (uncredited)
 The Dead Don't Dream (1948) - Jesse Williams
 Best Man Wins (1948) - Sheriff Dingle
 The Fuller Brush Man (1948) - Det. Ferguson (uncredited)
 Sinister Journey (1948) - Tom Smith
 Jinx Money (1948) - Mr. Morgan, Bank President (uncredited)
 Northwest Stampede (1948) - Bowles
 A Southern Yankee (1948) - Secret Service Agent (uncredited)
 The Man from Colorado (1948) - Roger MacDonald (uncredited)
 The Return of Wildfire (1948) - Pop Marlowe
 Adventures of Frank and Jesse James (1948, Serial) - Jim Powell [Ch.1]
 My Dear Secretary (1948) - Mr. McNally - Publisher (uncredited)
 Leather Gloves (1948) - Mr. Hubbard
 The Valiant Hombre (1948) - Sheriff George Dodge
 The Paleface (1948) - Commissioner Emerson
 Last of the Wild Horses (1948) - Rancher Pete Ferguson
 Brothers in the Saddle (1949) - Sheriff Oakley
 The Last Bandit (1949) - Jeff Baldwin
 Blondie's Big Deal (1949) - Mr. Forsythe
 Fighting Fools (1949) - Boxing Commissioner
 Roughshod (1949) - Sam Ellis (uncredited)
 The Doolins of Oklahoma (1949) - Coffeyville Sheriff (uncredited)
 Look for the Silver Lining (1949) - Producer (uncredited)
 Trail of the Yukon (1949) - Rogers
 Brimstone (1949) - Edward Winslow
 Tough Assignment (1949) - Chief Investigator Patterson
 Samson and Delilah (1949) - (uncredited)
 The Traveling Saleswoman (1950) - Dr. Stephen Monroe (uncredited)
 The Nevadan (1950) - Deputy Morgan (uncredited)
 Blonde Dynamite (1950) - Mr. Jennings, Bank President
 West of Wyoming (1950) - Simon Miller
 Mule Train (1950) - Chalmers (uncredited)
 Tyrant of the Sea (1950) - Officer (uncredited)
 The Arizona Cowboy (1950) - Jim Davenport
 Cargo to Capetown (1950) - Capt. Richards (uncredited)
 Riding High (1950) - Veterinarian (uncredited)
 Outcasts of Black Mesa (1950) - Sheriff Grasset
 Rock Island Trail (1950) - Businessman (uncredited)
 Salt Lake Raiders (1950) - Chief Marshal
 Colt .45 (1950) - Sheriff (uncredited)
 Trigger, Jr. (1950) - Rancher Wilkins
 Where Danger Lives (1950) - Dr. Matthews (uncredited)
 Streets of Ghost Town (1950) - Dusty Creek Sheriff
 Across the Badlands (1950) - Sheriff Crocker
 Two Flags West (1950) - Col. Hoffman (uncredited)
 Copper Canyon (1950) - Joe the Bartender (uncredited)
 Under Mexicali Stars (1950) - Race Announcer
 Short Grass (1950) - Pete Lynch
 Stage to Tucson (1950) - El Paso Sheriff Winters (uncredited)
 Al Jennings of Oklahoma (1951) - Marshal Ken Slattery
 Vengeance Valley (1951) - Mead Calhoun
 The Lemon Drop Kid (1951) - Judge Wilkinson (uncredited)
 Saddle Legion (1951) - Chief John Layton
 The Texas Rangers (1951) - Marshal Gorey (uncredited)
 Silver Canyon (1951) - Major Weatherly (uncredited)
 Hot Lead (1951) - Warden Lewis (uncredited)
 Utah Wagon Train (1951) - Sheriff
 Superman and the Mole Men (1951) - The Sheriff
 The Greatest Show on Earth (1952) - Spectator (uncredited)
 Lone Star (1952) - Mr. Thompson (uncredited)
 Waco (1952) - Judge
 Man from the Black Hills (1952) - Pop Fallon
 Talk About a Stranger (1952) - Mr. Wetzell, Orange Grower (uncredited)
 Kansas Territory (1952) - Governor
 And Now Tomorrow (1952)
 Carson City (1952) - Mine Owner on Train (uncredited)
 Thundering Caravans (1952) - Henry Scott
 Woman of the North Country (1952) - Captain (uncredited)
 Fargo (1952) - Judge Bruce
 Montana Belle (1952) - Marshal Combs
 Ride the Man Down (1952) - Phil Evarts (uncredited)
 The Bad and the Beautiful (1952) - Sheriff (uncredited)
 Powder River (1953) - Townsman (uncredited)
 Canadian Mounties vs. Atomic Invaders (1953, Serial) - Anderson [Chs.1-5]
 Ride, Vaquero! (1953) - Gen. Sheridan (uncredited)
 Dangerous Crossing (1953) - Ship's Pilot (uncredited)
 El Paso Stampede (1953) - Marshal Zeke Banning
 The Great Adventures of Captain Kidd (1953, Serial) - Trapper (uncredited)
 Appointment in Honduras (1953) - Capt. McTaggart
 Those Redheads from Seattle (1953) - Sheriff (uncredited)
 All the Brothers Were Valiant (1953) - Matthew Shore's Father (uncredited)
 Southwest Passage (1954) - Constable Bartlett (uncredited)
 Dawn at Socorro (1954) - Old Man Ferris
 The Steel Cage (1954) - Roy, Head Guard (segment "The Hostages")
 Treasure of Ruby Hills (1955) - Marshal Garvey
 The Night Holds Terror (1955) - Mr. Courtier (uncredited)
 The Twinkle in God's Eye (1955) - Sheriff (uncredited)
 Star in the Dust (1956) - Ben Smith
 The Three Outlaws (1956) - Railroad President
 Frontier Gambler (1956) - Constable Philo Dewey
 Gun for a Coward (1957) - Old Nester (uncredited)
 Untamed Youth (1957) - Farmer Collingwood (uncredited)
 Cole Younger, Gunfighter (1958) - The Judge (uncredited)
 Cry Terror! (1958) - Older Executive (uncredited) (final film)

References

External links

Article on Great Character Actors website

1891 births
1969 deaths
American male film actors
American male television actors
Male actors from Chicago
20th-century American male actors